John D. Keenan (born April 4, 1965) is an American attorney and politician who has served as the president of Salem State University since 2017. He was the Massachusetts State Representative for the 7th Essex district, which consists of his hometown of Salem,  from 2005 to 2014. He is a Democrat. Prior to serving in the Massachusetts legislature, he was assistant district attorney of Essex County and city solicitor of Salem.

Representative Keenan was from 2011 to 2014 the House Chair of Joint Committee on Telecommunications, Utilities and Energy. He resigned from the legislature August 23, 2014, and took his post at Salem State on August 25.

References

1965 births
Harvard College alumni
Democratic Party members of the Massachusetts House of Representatives
Politicians from Salem, Massachusetts
Salem State University presidents
Suffolk University Law School alumni
Living people